Azy-sur-Marne (literally Azy on Marne) is a commune in the department of Aisne in the Hauts-de-France region of northern France.

Geography
Azy-sur-Marne is located 4 km southwest of Château-Thierry and 20 km east of Montreuil-aux-Lions. It can be accessed by the D969 road from Essômes-sur-Marne in the north through the village then west through the commune and continuing south to Romeny-sur-Marne. There is also a country road going west to Mont de Bonneil. The commune is almost entirely farmland with small forests in the north and west. The commune is within the Appellation d'origine contrôlée zone of Aisne Champagne.

The southern border of the commune consists of the Marne river with no other identifiable watercourses in the commune.

Neighbouring communes and villages

History
The village was severely damaged in the battles of the Marne in World War I.

Administration

List of Successive Mayors of Azy-sur-Marne

Population

Sites and Monuments

The commune has two sites that are registered as historical monuments:
The Church of Saint Felix (12th century)
The Chateau Park

Other sites of interest
the Mercier Vineyard for Moët & Chandon Champagne

See also
Communes of the Aisne department

References

External links
Azy-sur-Marne on the old National Geographic Institute website 
Bell Towers website 
Azy-sur-Marne on Géoportail, National Geographic Institute (IGN) website 
Azy on the 1750 Cassini Map

Communes of Aisne